Ángel Gabriel Orelien González (born 2 April 2001) is a Panamanian professional footballer who plays as a winger.

Personal life
Orelien's father is French.

References

External links
 
 

2001 births
Living people
Panamanian footballers
Panama international footballers
Association football midfielders
Sportspeople from Panama City
Panamanian people of French descent
Sporting San Miguelito players
Liga Panameña de Fútbol players
Panamanian expatriate footballers
Expatriate footballers in Mexico